Marqués de Comillas is one of the 119 municipalities of Chiapas, in southern Mexico. Its municipal seat is Zamora Pico de Oro.

As of 2010, the municipality had a total population of 9,856, up from 8,580 as of 2005. It covers an area of 933 km².

The municipality had 28 localities, the largest of which (with 2010 populations in parentheses) were: Zamora Pico de Oro (1,734), classified as urban, and Emiliano Zapata (1,082), classified as rural.

References

Municipalities of Chiapas